The 3rd Syracuse Grand Prix was a non-championship Formula Two motor race held in Syracuse, Sicily on 22 March 1953. The race was won by Emmanuel de Graffenried in a Maserati A6GCM. Louis Chiron was second in an O.S.C.A. Tipo 20 and Rodney Nuckey third in a Cooper T23-Bristol. Alberto Ascari started from pole and set fastest lap but retired with mechanical failure, as did every other works Ferrari, in contrast to last year's 1-2-3 walkover.

Classification

Race

References

Syracuse
Syracuse Grand Prix
Syracuse
Syracuse